Jubilee Shout!!! is an album by jazz saxophonist Stanley Turrentine, recorded for the Blue Note label in 1962, but not released until 1986. The selection was originally included on the double LP Jubilee Shouts (1978, BN-LA883-J2), together with some tracks later appeared as Comin' Your Way. Said LP, however, omitted some tracks which may be found on the CD editions of both albums.

Reception
The Allmusic review by Ron Wynn & Michael Erlewine awarded the album 4 stars and calls it a "classic funky soul-jazz groove".

Track listing
All compositions by Stanley Turrentine except where noted
 "Jubilee Shout" - 10:44
 "My Ship" (Kurt Weill, Ira Gershwin) - 5:59
 "You Said It" (Tommy Turrentine) - 5:36
 "Brother Tom" - 7:43
 "Cotton Walk" - 10:58
 "Little Girl Blue" (Richard Rodgers, Lorenz Hart) - 6:27

Personnel
Stanley Turrentine - tenor saxophone
Tommy Turrentine - trumpet
Kenny Burrell - guitar
Sonny Clark - piano
Butch Warren - bass
Al Harewood - drums

Production
 Alfred Lion - producer
 Reid Miles - design
 Rudy Van Gelder - engineer
 Francis Wolff - photography

References

1986 albums
Stanley Turrentine albums
Blue Note Records albums
Albums produced by Alfred Lion
Albums recorded at Van Gelder Studio